Dina Zholaman is a Kazakh boxer. She competed at the 2016 AIBA Women's World Boxing Championships, winning the gold medal  in the bantamweight category. Zholaman also competed at the 2022 IBA Women's World Boxing Championships, winning the bronze medal in the bantamweight event.

References

External links 

Living people
Year of birth missing (living people)
Place of birth missing (living people)
Kazakhstani women boxers
Bantamweight boxers
AIBA Women's World Boxing Championships medalists
21st-century Kazakhstani women